Rocles is a commune in the Allier department in Auvergne in central France.

Population

Sights
 Château de la Lande, 15th century
 Etang du Lion, a pond which belonged in the past to the Castle of Montbillon in Saint-Sornin

See also
 Bourbonnais
 Communes of the Allier department

References

External links

  Pages about Rocles
  Château de La Lande
  Castle of Montbillon

Communes of Allier
Allier communes articles needing translation from French Wikipedia